Big Dreez is the fifth mixtape  by American rapper Dreezy. It was released on January 25, 2019, by Interscope Records. The mixtape features guest vocals by Derez De'Shon, Jacquees, Jeremih, Kash Doll, and rapper Offset. It also features production by Pi'erre Bourne, London on da Track, Swish, Take a Daytrip, and Southside, among others. The mixtape received positive reviews, with music critic Robert Christgau calling it a "step up" for Dreezy.

Critical reception 

Reviewing the mixtape for Vice, Robert Christgau said Dreezy's "only misstep here is a new Jeremih collab where—inevitably in a world where good sex is so often a stroke of luck—their concerted attempt to top the relaxed 'Body' with the overreaching 'Ecstasy' comes off forced and stiff. Romantic duets with Jacquees and Derez De'Shon aim lower and hit higher, however, and in general she sidles into money and fame brags with a reassuring ease that coexists nicely with her pitch-corrected raps and croons."

Track listing
Credits adapted from Tidal.

Personnel
Credits adapted from Tidal.
 Max Lord – recording (track 1)
 Brandon Hay – recording (track 4)
 Lloyd "2Fly" Mizell – recording (tracks: 5–6)
 Patrik Plummer – mixing (tracks: 1–4, 7–8), recording (tracks: 2–3, 6–9)
 Erik Madrid – mixing (tracks: 5, 9)
 Roark Bailey – mixing (track 10)
 William Binderup – mixing assistant (tracks: 5, 9)
 Kevin Peterson – mastering (tracks: 1–9)

References

2019 mixtape albums
Dreezy albums
Interscope Records albums
Albums produced by London on da Track
Albums produced by Southside (record producer)
Albums produced by Take a Daytrip